Valeria Milillo (born 25 September 1966) is an Italian actress.

Life and career 
Born in Milan, Milillo studied acting at the Accademia dei Filodrammatici in Milan, and attended stage courses in Rome, Paris, Berlin, Vienna, Zurich, and Munich.  She made her film debut in 1987 in the Dino Risi's comedy film Il commissario Lo Gatto. Active in films, television and on stage, in 2009 she was nominated in the best supporting actress category at the Nastro d'Argento for Francesca Archibugi's Due partite.

Selected filmography 
 Il commissario Lo Gatto (1987)
 Dinner with a Vampire (1988)
 Traces of an Amorous Life (1990)
 Red American (1991)
 The End Is Known (1992)
 The Second Time (1995)
 Notes of Love (1998)
 Don't Make Any Plans for Tonight (2006)
 A Game for Girls (2008)
 The Ladies Get Their Say (2009)

References

External links 
 

Italian film actresses
Italian television actresses
Italian stage actresses
1966 births
Actresses from Rome
Living people
20th-century Italian actresses
21st-century Italian actresses